Josip Jurendić (born 26 April 1987) is a Croatian football defender, currently playing for Uskok Klis.

Club career
He was promoted from the NK Zagreb U19 squad in 2005, and since then he has played 122 games for the club, scoring seven goals. In summer 2018 he surprisingly signed for third tier-side Urania Baška Voda instead of one of the interested top level sides.

References

External links

1987 births
Living people
Sportspeople from Slavonski Brod
Association football wingers
Association football fullbacks
Croatian footballers
Croatia youth international footballers
NK Zagreb players
NK Vrapče players
FK Dukla Prague players
RNK Split players
NK Hrvace players
NK Uskok players
Croatian Football League players
Czech First League players
Second Football League (Croatia) players
Croatian expatriate footballers
Expatriate footballers in the Czech Republic
Croatian expatriate sportspeople in the Czech Republic